Where's Wally in Hollywood? was released in 1993. In the book Wally, Wizard Whitebeard, Wenda, Woof, and Odlaw travel to movie and film sets in Hollywood. The book was re-released as a "Special Edition" version in 1997, moving Wally in each scene.

It is the fourth book in the Where's Wally? series.

Scenes
 A Dream Come True
 Shhh! This is a Silent Movie
 Horseplay in Troy
 Fun in the Foreign Legion
 A Tremendous Song and Dance
 Ali Baba and the Forty Thieves
 The Wild, Wild West
 The Swashbuckling Musketeers
 Dinosaurs, Spacemen, and Ghouls
 Robin Hood's Merry Mess-up
 When the Stars Come Out
 Where's Wally? The Musical

British picture books
Puzzle books
Where's Wally? books
1993 children's books
British children's books